Kizner is the name of two rural localities in Kiznersky District of the Udmurt Republic, Russia:

Kizner (selo), a selo in Kiznersky Selsoviet
Kizner (settlement), a settlement in Lipovsky Selsoviet